Some Like It Rare (originally titled Barbaque) is a 2021 French comedy horror film directed by , starring Marina Foïs and Éboué. The film depicts a struggling butcher shop run by a married couple who begin hunting humans who practice veganism and selling their meat, labeling it as "pork".

Cast
 Marina Foïs as Sophie Pascal
 Fabrice Éboué as Vincent Pascal
  as Marc Brachard
 Virginie Hocq as Stéphanie Brachard
 Lisa Do Couto Teixeira as Chloé Pascal
  as Lucas
  as Gendarme Ntamack
  as Joshua
 Alexia Chardard as Héméra
 Franck Migeon as Camille
 Colette Sodoyez as Madame Coignard
 Ted Etienne as Stéphane
  as Alexandre
 Tom Pezier as Winnie

Reception
Martin Unsworth of Starburst rated the film 4 stars out of 5 and wrote that it is a "sumptuous exercise in bad taste" and that that "works to its advantage". Matt Glasby of RadioTimes rated the film 4 stars out of 5 and called it "deeply, deliciously funny".

Paul Lê of Bloody Disgusting rated the film 3.5 skulls out of 5 and wrote that it will "undoubtedly satisfy a craving for something dark and weird without ever feeling too heavy." Film critic Anton Bitel, writing for VODzilla.co rated the film 3.5 stars out of 5 and called it "slyly funny" and "mildly shocking".

Cath Clarke of The Guardian rated the film 3 stars out of 5 and called it "lightweight" and "gruesomely hilarious in places". Mae Abdulbaki of ScreenRant gave the film a "Good" rating of 3 stars out of 5 and wrote that while the film "does wear off after a while" and that its commentary "could have been a lot more biting", it is "entertaining".

References

External links
 
 

French comedy horror films
2021 comedy horror films
Films about cannibalism